Panagaeus quadrisignatus is a species of ground beetle in the Panagaeinae subfamily that is endemic to Mexico.

References

Beetles described in 1835
Beetles of North America
Endemic insects of Mexico